In linguistics, abessive (abbreviated  or ), caritive and privative (abbreviated ) is the grammatical case expressing the lack or absence of the marked noun. In English, the corresponding function is expressed by the preposition without or by the suffix -less.

The name abessive is derived from  "to be away/absent", and is especially used in reference to Uralic languages. The name caritive is derived from  "to lack", and is especially used in reference to Caucasian languages. The name privative is derived from  "to deprive".

In Afro-Asiatic languages

Somali
For example:
 "love"
 "loveless"
 "clothes"
 "clothesless," i.e., naked

In Australian languages

Martuthunira

In Uralic languages

Finnish
For example:
 "money"
 "without money"
An equivalent construction exists using the word  and the partitive:
 "without money"
or, less commonly:
 "without money"
The abessive case of nouns is rarely used in writing and even less in speech, although some abessive forms are more common than their equivalent  forms:
 "unsuccessfully, fruitlessly"
 "I cried for no reason."
The abessive is, however, commonly used in nominal forms of verbs (formed with the affix  / ):
 "without speaking"
 "without buying"
 "without caring"
 "The train didn't show up."
This form can often be replaced by using the negative form of the verb:
 "The train didn't show up."

It is possible to occasionally hear what is considered wrong usage of the abessive in Finnish, where the abessive and  forms are combined:

There is debate as to whether this is interference from Estonian.

Estonian

 "without a car" (the preposition  "without" is optional)
Unlike in Finnish, the abessive is commonly used in both written and spoken Estonian.

The nominal forms of verbs are marked with the affix  and the abessive marker :
 "The train didn't show up."

Tallinn has a pair of bars that play on the use of the comitative and abessive, the Nimeta baar (the nameless bar) and the Nimega baar (the bar with a name).

Skolt Sami

The abessive marker for nouns in Skolt Sámi is -tää or -taa in both the singular and the plural:
Riâkkum veäʹrtää. "I cried for no reason."
The abessive-like non-finite verb form (converb) is -ǩâni or -kani:
Son vuõʹlji domoi mainsteǩâni mõʹnt leäi puättam. "He/she went home without saying why he/she had come."
Unlike Finnish, the Skolt Sámi abessive has no competing expression for lack of an item.

Inari Sami

The abessive marker for nouns in Inari Sámi is -táá. The corresponding non-finite verb form is -hánnáá, -hinnáá or -hennáá.

Other Sami languages
The abessive is not used productively in the Western Sámi languages, although it may occur as a cranberry morpheme.

Hungarian
In Hungarian, the abessive case is marked by -talan for back vowels and -telen for front vowels according to vowel harmony. Sometimes, with certain roots, the suffix becomes -tlan or -tlen. For example:
pénz "money"
pénztelen "without money"
haza "home(land)"
hazátlan "(one) without a homeland"
There is also the postposition nélkül, which also means without, but is not meant for physical locations.
Cukor nélkül iszom a teát. "I drink tea without sugar."
Testvér nélkül éltem. "I lived without siblings."
Eljöttél Magyarországra a testvéred nélkül? "Did you come to Hungary without your sibling?"

In Turkic languages

Bashkir

In Bashkir the suffix is -һыҙ/-һеҙ (-hïð/-hĭð).

Turkish
The suffix -siz (variations: -sız, -suz, -süz) is used in Turkish.

Ex: evsiz (ev = house, houseless/homeless), barksız, görgüsüz (görgü = good manners, ill-bred), yurtsuz.

Azerbaijani
The same suffix is used in the Azerbaijani language.

Chuvash

In Chuvash the suffix is -сӑр.

Kyrgyz

In Kyrgyz the suffix is -сIз.

In Mongolic languages

Mongolian

It is not universally considered to be a case, due to the fact that the suffix does not conform to vowel harmony or undergo any stem-dependent orthographical variation. However, its grammatical function is the precise inverse of the comitative case, and the two form a pair of complementary case forms.

See also
Essive case
Inessive case 
In Russian, Abessive is known as the Caritive (лиши́тельный), used with the negation of verbs: не знать пра́вды (not know the truth) – знать пра́вду (know the truth). This case sometimes is identical to the genitive and sometimes to the accusative

References

Further reading

External links
Comparative concept caritive, as defined by the St.Petersburg project "Typology of caritive"
Glossary of linguistic terms - What is abessive case? 

Grammatical cases